The Dattatreya night frog (Nyctibatrachus dattatreyaensis) is a species of frog in the family Nyctibatrachidae first described in the Shola forests around the Dattatreya Peeta in the Chikkamagaluru district of Karnataka. It is still known only from this part of the Western Ghats, India.

Description
This species' head is wider than long; the skin on the dorsum is highly wrinkled with transverse corrugated folds -  three discontinuous longitudinal folds, one dorsolaterally and two laterally; the webbing on toes is medium (three-quarters of the length); two yellowish bands occur on the dorsolateral area, prominent from subadult to adult stage; femoral glands are present. N. dattatreyaensis is a medium-sized (about 40 mm) frog active during night. The thumb pad and femoral glands are prominent in mature males. The eyes are golden yellow with black rhomboidal pupils. The upper surface of the body is reddish-black to stone black, with two yellow lateral bands. In day time, the frog prefers to hide below small boulders and damp leaf litter along the slow-flowing streams of the Shola forests in the hill ranges.

Discovery
The frog was discovered in 2008 by scientists from Zoological Survey of India. It was named Nyctibatrachus dattatreyaensis, after the Dattatreya shrine in its habitat.

Distribution
Nyctibatrachus dattatreyaensis is only known only from Dattatreya Peeta in the Bhadra Wildlife Sanctuary, Kemmangundi, and Baba Budangiri. All these sites are located in the Chikkamagaluru district, Karnataka, India.

Conservation status and risks
The Chandra Drona Parvatha hill ranges are noted for medicinal herbs. Unauthorised collection of herbs is rampant. The area is under immense human pressure from ecotourism. The water source of the Manikyadhara Falls is endangered. Consequently, Nyctibatrachus dattatreyaensis is assessed as being "critically endangered".

References

External links

Nyctibatrachus
Frogs of India
Endemic fauna of the Western Ghats
Amphibians described in 2008